Lerheimia aviculata is a species of chironomid midge only known from the western Usambara Mountains in Tanzania. It is only separable from its congeners from details of the genitalia.

References
Lerheimia, a new genus of Orthocladiinae from Africa (Diptera: Chironomidae)

Chironomidae
Insects described in 1993